Elisabeth Ford may refer to:

Betty Ford, first lady of the United States from 1974 to 1977, as the wife of President Gerald Ford
Elizabeth Johnson (actress) (1771 —1830), English actress who performed under her maiden name Elizabeth Ford before her marriage